Ashleigh Barty and CoCo Vandeweghe defeated Tímea Babos and Kristina Mladenovic in the final, 3–6, 7–6(7–2), 7–6(8–6) to win the women's doubles tennis title at the 2018 US Open.

Babos retained the WTA no. 1 doubles ranking after the tournament as Ekaterina Makarova failed to reach the final and Kateřina Siniaková failed to claim the title.

Latisha Chan and Martina Hingis were the defending champions, but Hingis retired from professional tennis at the end of 2017. Chan played alongside Victoria Azarenka, but they retired in the second round against Raquel Atawo and Anna-Lena Grönefeld.

Seeds

Draw

Finals

Top half

Section 1

Section 2

Bottom half

Section 3

Section 4

References

External links
2018 US Open – Women's draws and results at the International Tennis Federation

US Open (tennis) by year – Women's doubles
Women's Doubles
US Open - Women's Doubles
US Open - Women's Doubles